Bukat is a language of West Kalimantan, Indonesia, one of several spoken by the Penan people.

References

Languages of Indonesia
Punan languages